Hyloxalus pulchellus is a species of frog in the family Dendrobatidae from northern Ecuador and southern Colombia. Colombina source does not include Nariño but does include Putumayo Department.

Distribution
Hyloxalus pulchellus is found in the inter-Andean páramos of northern Ecuador and adjacent Colombia (Nariño and Cauca Departments) and on the eastern slopes of the Andes from southern Colombia south in Ecuador to the headwaters of the Pastaza River. Colombian source does not include Nariño but does include Putumayo Department. Its altitudinal range is  asl; at the higher end of this range it is the only frog species of this kind.

Description
Males measure  and females  in snout–vent length. Dorsum is dark brown with diffuse greenish tint. It has an oblique lateral stripe extending to eye, cream with iridescent golden tint in colour and sometimes edged with brown or black.

Behaviour
Male frogs call in or from under grass. The call is a buzz emitted 72 times during 4 minutes.

Habitat and conservation
Its natural habitats are dry and humid montane forests. It is threatened by habitat loss, possibly also climate change and chytridiomycosis. It has disappeared from many sites in Ecuador but remains common in Colombia.

References

pulchellus
Amphibians of the Andes
Amphibians of Colombia
Amphibians of Ecuador
Amphibians described in 1875
Taxa named by Marcos Jiménez de la Espada
Taxonomy articles created by Polbot